Nicklas Helenius Jensen (born 8 May 1991) is a Danish professional footballer who plays as a forward for AaB.

Club career

Aalborg BK
Helenius joined the Aalborg BK youth squad at the age of 13 and received his first contract while in the U19 squad. In the 2009–10 season, he became the top goalscorer of the Aalborg BK under-19 squad in the Danish under-19 league with 22 goals. This was enough for him to finish second on the overall goal scorer list, only beaten by Brent McGrath who scored 29 goals for Brøndby IF.

After the 2009–10 season, he made his professional football debut for Aalborg BK on 16 May 2010 against HB Køge. Helenius scored his first goal for Aalborg BK in the Danish Superliga on 10 September 2010 against AC Horsens and got his first breakthrough in the AaB lineup after scoring a total of four goals in four consecutive league games and one goal in the Danish Cup in October and November 2010.

Following the 2012–13 season, he was selected as player of the season in the Danish Superliga on the UEFA website.

A popular chant amongst the AaB supporters was "vi elsker vold og kokain – og Nicklas Helenius", directly translated to "we love violence and cocaine – and Nicklas Helenius", as a sarcastic reference to the hooligan culture. The chant was based on the tune Eviva Espana.

Aston Villa
On 18 June 2013, Helenius signed for Aston Villa on a three-year deal believed to be in the region of £1.2m. He scored a header on his debut in Villa's first pre-season game of the season, against German team SV Rödinghausen. He followed this up with another headed goal against VfL Bochum on his second appearance for the club. He made his Premier League debut on 24 August 2013 at Villa Park against Liverpool which ended in a 1–0 defeat. Helenius scored his first goal for the club on 4 January 2014 against Sheffield United in an FA Cup third round tie at Villa Park. Helenius gained notoriety when he got his shorts pulled down by Jan Vertonghen in a game against Tottenham Hotspur, revealing his underpants.

After only three league games for Aston Villa in the first half season, Helenius was expected to leave the club. Helenius failed to become a regular part of the match day squad and would often not even be included. With a lack of interest from suitable buyers he found himself seeing the season out in the sidelines, only making one appearance in the 2014 campaign in an FA Cup game against Sheffield United F.C where he also scored his only goal for Aston Villa. Helenius' agent revealed in May 2014, that Helenius was not a part of Aston Villa's future plans and therefore had to leave the club. Helenius revealed that a reason behind his struggles were a bacterial infection and an addiction to sleeping pills. Helenius had many clubs interested, like IFK Göteborg and AaB. Aston Villa also rejected a bid from IFK Göteborg.

Loan to AaB
On 9 July 2014, Helenius returned to his previous club AaB on a season long loan deal. He was very happy to be back and expected a turbulent season with a two-digit number of goals. He had a good season with 14 goals in 43 games and he was set to make the transfer permanent, as Aston Villa did not want to keep him.

Return to AaB
Helenius joined AaB on a permanent transfer in July 2015. But in this season, opposite the last season, Helenius was the fourth choice and did not get much time on the pitch. A situation, that Helenius was not happy with, and he announced, that he would like to go out on loan.

Loan to SC Paderborn 07
On 1 February 2016, it was confirmed that Helenius would play for SC Paderborn on loan from AaB. He played his first game for Paderborn on 5 February 2016 in a 1–0 loss against SV Sandhausen. Helenius got some playing time, and scored 4 league goals in 14 games.

Back to AaB
Helenius played the first three season games for AaB, one from start and two from the bench. However, he was sent out on loan once again. His contract would expire in the summer 2017 and Helenius announced, that he would not be extending it. So he would be leaving the club after he was back from loan.

Loan to Silkeborg IF
On 10 August 2016, it was confirmed, that Helenius was loaned out to Silkeborg IF for the whole season. He played 29 league games and scored 10 goals in this season.

OB
On 30 January 2017, it was confirmed that OB had signed Helenius from AaB, but first valid from when his contract expired with AaB in the summer of 2017.

AGF
On 7 July 2019, Helenius joined AGF on a three-year contract.

Return to Silkeborg
On 14 December 2020, Silkeborg IF confirmed that Helenius would return to the club from 2021 on a 3.5-year contract.

Return to AaB
In January 2023, Helenius returned to AaB, signigning a deal until the end of 2025.

International career
Helenius got his first international call up in January 2010 for the Danish under-19, but had to leave it due to an ankle sprain.
One year later, he was called up to the Denmark U21 squad for a training camp in Dubai. He got his under-21 debut on 20 January 2011 in a training match against China.
Helenius' goals at U-21 Level include the opening goal of the 3–0 victory over Northern Ireland in September 2011.

On 15 August 2012 he made his debut for the Denmark national football team against Slovakia.

Career statistics

References

External links

Danish Superliga statistics

1991 births
Living people
People from Aalborg Municipality
Sportspeople from the North Jutland Region
Danish men's footballers
Association football forwards
Denmark international footballers
Denmark under-21 international footballers
Denmark youth international footballers
Danish Superliga players
Premier League players
2. Bundesliga players
AaB Fodbold players
Aston Villa F.C. players
SC Paderborn 07 players
Silkeborg IF players
Odense Boldklub players
Aarhus Gymnastikforening players
Danish expatriate men's footballers
Danish expatriate sportspeople in England
Expatriate footballers in England
Danish expatriate sportspeople in Germany
Expatriate footballers in Germany